A lake monster is a lake-dwelling entity in folklore. The most famous example is the Loch Ness Monster. Depictions of lake monsters are often similar to those of sea monsters.

In the Motif-Index of Folk-Literature, entities classified as "lake monsters", such as the Scottish Loch Ness Monster, the American Chessie, and the Swedish Storsjöodjuret fall under B11.3.1.1. ("dragon lives in lake").

Theories
According to the Swedish naturalist and author Bengt Sjögren (1980), present-day lake monsters are variations of older legends of water kelpies. Sjögren claims that the accounts of lake-monsters have changed during history, as do others. Older reports often talk about horse-like appearances, but more modern reports often have more reptile and dinosaur-like appearances; he concludes that the legendary kelpies have evolved into the present day saurian lake-monsters since the discovery of dinosaurs and giant aquatic reptiles and the popularization of them in both scientific and fictional writings and art.

The stories cut across cultures, existing in some variation in many countries. and have undergone what Michel Meurger calls concretizing (The process of turning items, drawings, general beliefs and stories into a plausible whole) and naturalization over time as humanity's view of the world has changed.

In many of these areas, especially around Loch Ness, Lake Champlain and the Okanagan Valley, these lake monsters have become important tourist draws.

In Ben Radford and Joe Nickell's book Lake Monster Mysteries, the authors attribute a vast number of sightings to otter misidentifications. Ed Grabianowski plotted the distribution of North American lake monster sightings and then overlaid this with the distribution of the common otter and found a near perfect match. It turns out that three or four otters swimming in a line look remarkably like a serpentine, humped creature undulating through the water, very easy to mistake for a single creature if you see them from a distance. "This isn't speculation. I'm not making this up," Nickell said. "I've spoken to people who saw what they thought was a lake monster, got closer and discovered it was actually a line of otters. That really happens." Clearly, not every lake monster sighting can be accounted for with otters, but it's an excellent example of how our perceptions can be fooled.

Paul Barrett and Darren Naish note that the existence of any large animals in isolation (i.e., in a situation where no breeding population exists) is highly unlikely. Naish also observes that the stories are likely remnants of tales meant to keep children safely away from the water.

There have been many purported sightings of lake monsters, and even some photographs, but each time these have either been shown to be deliberate deceptions, such as the Lake George Monster Hoax, or serious doubts about the veracity and verifiability have arisen, as with the famous Mansi photograph of Champ.

Examples

Well-known lake monsters include:
 Mishipeshu Lake Superior
 Nessie, in Loch Ness, Scotland
 Morag, in Loch Morar, Scotland
 Lagarfljót Worm, in Lagarfljót, Iceland
 Ogopogo, in Okanagan Lake, Canada
 Lariosauro, in Lake Como, Italy
 Champ, in Lake Champlain, Canada and US
 Memphre, in Lake Memphremagog, Canada and US
 Bessie, in Lake Erie, Canada and US
 Nahuelito, in Nahuel Huapi Lake, Argentina
 Muyso or Monster of Lake Tota, in Lake Tota, Colombia
 Van Gölü Canavarı or Lake Van Monster, in Lake Van, Turkey
 Inkanyamba, in Howick Falls, South Africa
 Tahoe Tessie, in Lake Tahoe, US
 Flathead Lake Monster, Flathead Lake, Montana, US

See also  

 River Monsters, wildlife documentary television programme

References

Mythological aquatic creatures
Fictional monsters
Water monsters